"God's Kitchen" is a song by English synth-pop duo Blancmange, released in March 1982 as a double A-side with "I've Seen the Word". It was the lead single from the duo's debut studio album Happy Families (1982). "God's Kitchen" and "I've Seen the Word" was written by Neil Arthur and Stephen Luscombe, and produced by Mike Howlett. The single reached No. 65 in the UK and remained on the charts for two weeks.

In a 2011 interview with Penny Black Music, Arthur considered the song to be "fairly bleak".
He recalled of the song to FutureMusic, "If I'd have only ever had one record with Blancmange, like 'God's Kitchen' then that would have sufficed. I remember hearing that track for the first time on Radio 1's Peter Powell Show and we drove across three lanes of the motorway we were so excited."

Critical reception
Upon release, Dave Rimmer of Smash Hits commented, "Well, this young synthesizer duo have looked for God in their kitchen. They've look for him in their room. They've look for him in their lampshade. They have hunted high and low for him. Pity they didn't take time out to find a good tune. Brill sleeve though." In a retrospective review of Happy Families (1982), Bill Cassel of AllMusic considered "God's Kitchen" as one of the album's highlights. Paul Scott-Bates of Louder Than War noted the song's "raunchy, dismembered sound" compared with the more "ballad-like" and "melodious" "I've Seen the Word".

Track listing
7" single
 "I've Seen the Word" – 3:01
 "God's Kitchen" – 2:53

12" single
 "God's Kitchen" – 4:27
 "I've Seen the Word" – 3:01

Personnel
Blancmange
 Neil Arthur – lead vocals
 Stephen Luscombe – keyboards, synthesizers

Additional personnel
 David Rhodes – guitar
 Mike Howlett – producer
 Tim Young – mastering

Charts

References

External links

1982 songs
1982 singles
Blancmange (band) songs
London Records singles
Songs written by Neil Arthur
Songs written by Stephen Luscombe
Song recordings produced by Mike Howlett